This is a list of home video releases of the Good Eats series. Unlike many television shows, the episodes on each release are grouped by category, not season.

Good Eats – A Tale Of Two Roasts – The Lost Episode Of Good Eats
Episodes
"Celebrity Roast (Aired Version)"
"Celebrity Roast (Unaired Version)"
Bonus Material
Alton's Commentary
Meet The Crew
Alton Brown Bio
Previews

Good Eats – All American Greats
Episodes
"A Grind Is A Terrible Thing To Waste"
"Ear Apparent"
"American Pickle"
Bonus Material
Ask Alton
Recipes
Alton Brown Bio
Previews

Good Eats – Breakfast Eats
Episodes
"True Brew"
"The Egg-Files"
"Flap Jack Do It Again"
Bonus Material
Ask Alton
Recipes
Alton Brown Bio
Previews

Good Eats – Breakfast Eats 2
Episodes
"Oat Cuisine"
"Good Milk Gone Bad"
"True Brew II"
Bonus Material
Ask Alton
Alton Brown Bio
Previews

Good Eats – Breakfast Eats 4
Episodes
"Power Trip"
"Toast Modern"
"Urban Preservation Part 1"
Bonus Material
Ask Alton
Alton Brown Bio
Previews

Good Eats – Condiment Nation
Episodes
"Chile's Angels"
"Spice Capades"
"Eat This Rock"
Bonus Material
Ask Alton
Alton Brown Bio
Previews

Good Eats – Family Favorites
Episodes
"Casserole Over"
"This Spud's For You"
"For Whom the Cheese Melts II"
Bonus Material
Ask Alton
Alton Brown Bio
Previews

Good Eats – Flour Power
Episodes
"The Dough Also Rises"
"Puff The Magic Pastry"
"Choux Shine"
Bonus Material
Ask Alton
Alton Brown Bio
Previews

Good Eats – Fruit Fest
Episodes
"Apple Family Values"
"Strawberry Sky"
"Top Banana"
Bonus Material
Ask Alton
Alton Brown Bio
Previews

Good Eats – Good Eats On The Table
Disc 1 – Great Main Dishes
Episodes
"Oh My, Meat Pie"
"The Alton Crown Affair"
"Fishn' Whole"
Bonus Material
Biography
Foodnetwork.com
Disc 2 – Veggies On The Side
Episodes
"If It Ain't Broccoli Don't Fix It"
"A Cabbage Sprouts In Brussels"
"Celeryman"
Bonus Material
Biography
Foodnetwork.com
Disc 3 – Save Room For Dessert
Episodes
"Switched On Baklava"
"Puff The Magic Mallow"
"Honey, I Shrunk The Cake"
Bonus Material
Biography
Foodnetwork.com

Good Eats – Italian Eats
Episodes
"Pantry Raid II Seeing Red"
"Flat Is Beautiful"
"Use Your Noodle II"
Bonus Material
Ask Alton
Alton Brown Bio
Previews

Good Eats – Juicy Meats 3
Episodes
"Ham I Am"
"Chops Ahoy"
"A Beautiful Grind"
Bonus Material
Ask Alton
Alton Brown Bio
Previews

Good Eats – Kitchen Classics
Disc 1 – That's Classic
Episodes
"American Classics I"
"Stew Romance"
"Sub Standards"
Bonus Material
Good Eats Bloopers
Alton Brown Biography
Food Network Promos
Foodnetwork.com
Disc 2 – Time Of The Seasoning
Episodes
"Herbal Preservation"
"Major Pepper"
"My Pod"
Bonus Material
Good Eats Bloopers
Alton Brown Biography
Food Network Promos
Foodnetwork.com
Disc 3 – Coffee And Dessert
Episodes
"Espress Yourself"
"Coconut Cake Revival"
"Churn Baby Churn II"
Bonus Material
Good Eats Bloopers
Alton Brown Biography
Food Network Promos
Foodnetwork.com

Good Eats – Kitchen Wisdom From Good Eats
Disc 1 – The Fruit Bowl
Episodes
"Orange Aid"
"Kinda Blue"
"Cran Opening"
Bonus Material
Bio
Disc 2 – Bake It Up
Episodes
"Going Dutch"
"Popover Sometime"
"Going Crackers"
Disc 3 – Secrets Of Your Kitchen
Episodes
"Frozen Cache"
"There Will Be Oil"
"Pantry Raid X: Dark Side Of The Cane"

Good Eats – Loafing Around
Episodes
"Sandwich Craft"
"My Big Fat Greek Sandwich"
"Dr. Strangeloaf"
Bonus Material
Ask Alton
Alton Brown Bio
Previews

Good Eats – Ocean Edibles
Episodes
"Mussel Bound"
"Send In The Clams"
"Mission: Poachable"
Bonus Material
Ask Alton
Alton Brown Bio
Previews

Good Eats – Pantastic Eats
Episodes
"Cuckoo For Coq Au Vin"
"The Pouch Principle"
"The Big Chili"
Bonus Material
Ask Alton
Alton Brown Bio
Previews

Good Eats – Pantry Raids
Episodes
"Pantry Raid I: Use Your Noodle"
"Pantry Raid: Cool Beans"
"Pantry Raid IV: Comb Alone"
Bonus Material
Ask Alton
Alton Brown Bio
Previews

Good Eats – Poultry Pleasers
Episodes
"What's Up Duck?"
"Fry Hard II: The Chicken"
"The Bulb Of The Night"
Bonus Material
Ask Alton
Recipes
Alton Brown Bio
Previews

Good Eats – Say Cheese
Episodes
"For Whom The Cheese Melts"
"Egg Files V: Quantum Foam"
"A Bowl Of Onion"
Bonus Material
Ask Alton
Alton Brown Bio
Previews

Good Eats – Souped Up
Episodes
"Pressure"
"True Brew IV: Take Stock"
"Soup's On"
Bonus Material
Ask Alton
Alton Brown Bio
Previews

Good Eats – Super Sweets 2
Episodes
"Art Of Darkness II"
"Let Them Eat Foam"
"The Trouble With Cheesecake"
Bonus Material
Ask Alton
Recipes
Alton Brown Bio
Previews

Good Eats – Super Sweets 3
Episodes
"Crust Never Sleeps"
"A Cake On Every Plate"
"The Icing Man Cometh"
Bonus Material
Ask Alton
Alton Brown Bio
Previews

Good Eats – Super Sweets 4
Episodes
"Citizen Cane"
"The Trick To Treats"
"Fudge Factor"
Bonus Material
Ask Alton
Alton Brown Bio
Previews

Good Eats – Super Sweets 5
Episodes
"I Pie"
"Circle Of Life"
"The Cookie Clause"
Bonus Material
Ask Alton
Alton Brown Bio
Previews

Good Eats – Super Sweets 6
Episodes
"Art Of Darkness III"
"Deep Space Slime"
"Puddin' Head Blues"
Bonus Material
Ask Alton
Alton Brown Bio
Previews

Good Eats – The Ripe Stuff
Episodes
"Melondrama"
"Cobbled Together"
"Down And Out In Paradise"
Bonus Material
Ask Alton
Alton Brown Bio
Previews

Good Eats – Tossed Around
Episodes
"Salad Daze"
"Salad Daze II"
"This Spud's For You Too"
Bonus Material
Ask Alton
Alton Brown Bio
Previews

Good Eats – Veggie Eats
Episodes
"Tomato Envy"
"Deep Purple"
"The Choke's On You"
Bonus Material
Ask Alton
Alton Brown Bio
Previews

Good Eats – Veggie Eats 2
Episodes
"The Fungal Gourmet"
"Head Games"
"Squash Court"
Bonus Material
Ask Alton
Alton Brown Bio
Previews

Good Eats – Veggie Eats 3
Episodes
"Sprung A Leek"
"Field Of Greens"
"Give Peas A Chance"
Bonus Material
Ask Alton
Alton Brown Bio
Previews

Good Eats – Waves Of Grains
Episodes
"True Grits"
"Ill Gotten Grains"
"Power To The Pilaf"
Bonus Material
Ask Alton
Alton Brown Bio
Previews

Good Eats – Volume 1 – All Season Edibles
Disc 1 – Juicy Meats
Episodes
"Pork Fiction"
"Steak Your Claim"
"A Bird in the Pan"
Bonus Material
Ask Alton
Alton Brown Biography
Food Network Promos
Foodnetwork.com
Disc 2 – Super Sweets
Episodes
"Three Chips for Sister Marsha"
"The Art of Darkness"
"Churn Baby Churn"
Bonus Material
Ask Alton
Alton Brown Biography
Food Network Promos
Foodnetwork.com
Disc 3 – Holiday Treats
Episodes
"Romancing the Bird"
"Behind the Bird"
"It's a Wonderful Cake"
Bonus Material
Ask Alton
Alton Brown Biography
Food Network Promos
Foodnetwork.com

Good Eats – Volume 2 – Wooed by American Food
Disc 1 – All American Greats
Episodes
"A Grind Is A Terrible Thing To Waste"
"Ear Apparent"
"American Pickle"
Bonus Material
Ask Alton
Alton Brown Biography
Food Network Promos
Foodnetwork.com
Disc 2 – Breakfast Eats
Episodes
"True Brew I"
"The Egg Files"
"Flap Jack Do It Again"
Bonus Material
Ask Alton
Alton Brown Biography
Food Network Promos
Foodnetwork.com
Disc 3 – Super Sweets 2
Episodes
"The Art of Darkness II"
"Let Them Eat Foam"
"The Trouble with Cheesecake"
Bonus Material
Ask Alton
Alton Brown Biography
Food Network Promos
Foodnetwork.com

Good Eats – Volume 3 – Two If By Land, One If By Sea
Disc 1 – Hooked And Cooked
Episodes
"Hook, Line & Dinner"
"Where There's Smoke There's Fish"
"The Other Red Meat"
Bonus Material
Ask Alton
Alton Brown Biography
Food Network Promos
Foodnetwork.com
Disc 2 – Poultry Pleasers
Episodes
"What's Up Duck?"
"Fry Hard II: The Chicken"
"The Bulb Of The Night"
Bonus Material
Ask Alton
Alton Brown Biography
Food Network Promos
Foodnetwork.com
Disc 3 – More Meats
Episodes
"Grill Seekers"
"A Chuck For Chuck"
"Celebrity Roast"
Bonus Material
Ask Alton
Alton Brown Biography
Food Network Promos
Foodnetwork.com

Good Eats – Volume 4 – Incredible Edibles
Disc 1 – Super Sweets 3
Episodes
"Crust Never Sleeps"
"A Cake On Every Plate"
"The Icing Man Cometh"
Bonus Material
Ask Alton
Alton Brown Biography
Food Network Promos
Foodnetwork.com
Disc 2 – Family Favorites
Episodes
"Casserole Over"
"This Spud's For You"
"For Whom the Cheese Melts II – Mac and Cheese"
Bonus Material
Ask Alton
Alton Brown Biography
Food Network Promos
Foodnetwork.com
Disc 3 – Say Cheese
Episodes
"For Whom The Cheese Melts – Grilled Cheese"
"Egg Files V: Quantum Foam"
"A Bowl Of Onion"
Bonus Material
Ask Alton
Alton Brown Biography
Food Network Promos
Foodnetwork.com

Good Eats – Volume 5 – Sweet Somethings
Disc 1 – Sugar For The Senses
Episodes
"Citizen Cane"
"The Trick To Treats"
"Fudge Factor"
Bonus Material
Ask Alton
Alton Brown Biography
Food Network Promos
Foodnetwork.com
Disc 2 – A Perfect Batch
Episodes
"I Pie"
"Circle Of Life"
"The Cookie Clause"
Bonus Material
Ask Alton
Alton Brown Biography
Food Network Promos
Foodnetwork.com
Disc 3 – Sweet Daze
Episodes
"Art Of Darkness III"
"Deep Space Slime"
"Puddin' Head Blues"
Bonus Material
Ask Alton
Alton Brown Biography
Food Network Promos
Foodnetwork.com

Good Eats – Volume 6 – Marvelous Meals
Disc 1 – Breakfast Eats 2
Episodes
"Oat Cuisine"
"Good Milk Gone Bad"
"True Brew II"
Bonus Material
Ask Alton
Alton Brown Biography
Food Network Promos
Foodnetwork.com
Disc 2 – Veggie Eats
Episodes
"Tomato Envy"
"Deep Purple"
"The Choke's On You"
Bonus Material
Ask Alton
Alton Brown Biography
Food Network Promos
Foodnetwork.com
Disc 3 – Tossed Around
Episodes
"Salad Daze"
"Salad Daze II"
"This Spud's For You Too"
Bonus Material
Ask Alton
Alton Brown Biography
Food Network Promos
Foodnetwork.com

Good Eats – Volume 7 – Rise And Swine
Disc 1 – Breakfast Eats 3
Episodes
"Scrap Iron Chef"
"Egg Files VI: French Flop"
"The Muffin Man"
Bonus Material
Ask Alton
Alton Brown Biography
Food Network Promos
Foodnetwork.com
Disc 2 – Fruit Fest
Episodes
"Apple Family Values"
"Strawberry Sky"
"Top Banana"
Bonus Material
Ask Alton
Alton Brown Biography
Food Network Promos
Foodnetwork.com
Disc 3 – Manly Eats
Episodes
"Raising The Steaks"
"Q"
"The Man Food Show"
Bonus Material
Ask Alton
Alton Brown Biography
Food Network Promos
Foodnetwork.com

Good Eats – Volume 8 – Delicious Dishes
Disc 1 – Condiment Nation
Episodes
"Chile's Angles"
"Spice Capades"
"Eat This Rock"
Bonus Material
Ask Alton
Alton Brown Biography
Food Network Promos
Foodnetwork.com
Disc 2 – Veggie Eats 2
Episodes
"The Fungal Gourmet"
"Head Games"
"Squash Court"
Bonus Material
Ask Alton
Alton Brown Biography
Food Network Promos
Foodnetwork.com
Disc 3 – Ocean Edibles 2
Episodes
"Crustacean Nation"
"Crustacean Nation II: Claws"
"Crustacean Nation III: Feeling Crabby"
Bonus Material
Ask Alton
Alton Brown Biography
Food Network Promos
Foodnetwork.com

Good Eats – Volume 9 – My Fair Pastry
Disc 1 – Flour Power
Episodes
"The Dough Also Rises"
"Puff The Magic Pastry"
"Choux Shine"
Bonus Material
Ask Alton
Alton Brown Biography
Food Network Promos
Foodnetwork.com
Disc 2 – Super Sweets 4
Episodes
"Citizen Cane"
"The Trick To Treats"
"Fudge Factor"
Bonus Material
Ask Alton
Alton Brown Biography
Food Network Promos
Foodnetwork.com
Disc 3 – Super Sweets 5
Episodes
"I Pie"
"Circle Of Life"
"The Cookie Clause"
Bonus Material
Ask Alton
Alton Brown Biography
Food Network Promos
Foodnetwork.com

Good Eats – Volume 10 – Not By Bread Alone 
Disc 1 – Waves of Grains
Episodes
"True Grits"
"Ill Gotten Grains"
"Power to the Pilaf"
Bonus Material
Ask Alton
Alton Brown Biography
Food Network Promos
Foodnetwork.com
Disc 2 – Souped Up
Episodes
"Pressure"
"True Brew IV: Take Stock"
"Soup's On"
Bonus Material
Ask Alton
Alton Brown Biography
Food Network Promos
Foodnetwork.com
Disc 3 – Loafing Around
Episodes
"Sandwich Craft"
"My Big Fat Greek Sandwich"
"Dr. Strangeloaf"
Bonus Material
Ask Alton
Alton Brown Biography
Food Network Promos
Foodnetwork.com

Good Eats – Volume 11 – Cupboard Cuisine
Disc 1 – Pantry Raids
Episodes
"Pantry Raid I: Use Your Noodle"
"Pantry Raid III: Cool Beans"
"Pantry Raid IV: Comb Alone"
Bonus Material
Ask Alton
Alton Brown Biography
Food Network Promos
Foodnetwork.com
Disc 2 – Pantastic Eats
Episodes
"Cuckoo For Coq Au Vin"
"The Pouch Principle"
"The Big Chili"
Bonus Material
Ask Alton
Alton Brown Biography
Food Network Promos
Foodnetwork.com
Disc 3 – Veggie Eats 3
Episodes
"Sprung A Leek"
"Field Of Greens"
"Give Peas A Chance"
Bonus Material
Ask Alton
Alton Brown Biography
Food Network Promos
Foodnetwork.com

Good Eats – Volume 12 – Some Like It Sweet 
Disc 1 – Breakfast Eats 4
Episodes
"Power Trip"
"Toast Modern"
"Urban Preservation I: Jam Session"
Bonus Material
Ask Alton
Alton Brown Biography
Food Network Promos
Foodnetwork.com
Disc 2 – Super Sweets 6
Episodes
"Art Of Darkness III"
"Deep Space Slime"
"Puddin' Head Blues"
Bonus Material
Ask Alton
Alton Brown Biography
Food Network Promos
Foodnetwork.com
Disc 3 – The Ripe Stuff
Episodes
"Melondrama"
"Cobbled Together"
"Down and Out in Paradise"
Bonus Material
Ask Alton
Alton Brown Biography
Food Network Promos
Foodnetwork.com

Good Eats – Volume 13 – Whet Your Appetite
Disc 1 – Far East Fare
Episodes
"Wake Up Little Sushi"
"Wonton Ways"
"Your Pad Thai Or Mine"
Bonus Material
Ask Alton
Alton Brown Biography
Food Network Promos
Foodnetwork.com
Disc 2 – Drink Up
Episodes
"Amber Waves"
"Raising the Bar"
"School of Hard Nogs"
Bonus Material
Ask Alton
Alton Brown Biography
Food Network Promos
Foodnetwork.com
Disc 3 – Snack Attack
Episodes
"Dip Madness"
"Olive Me"
"Say Cheese"
Bonus Material
Ask Alton
Alton Brown Biography
Food Network Promos
Foodnetwork.com

Good Eats – Volume 14 – Surf, Turf & A Side
Disc 1 – Tastes From the Sea
Episodes
"Fry Hard"
"Shell Game"
"Shell Game IV"
Bonus Material
Ask Alton
Alton Brown Biography
Food Network Promos
Foodnetwork.com
Disc 2 – Garden Greats
Episodes
"A Taproot Orange"
"Beet It"
"Potato, My Sweet"
Bonus Material
Ask Alton
Alton Brown Biography
Food Network Promos
Foodnetwork.com
Disc 3 – Prime Meats
Episodes
"Great Balls O' Meat"
"Tender is the Loin I"
"Tender is the Loin II"
Bonus Material
Ask Alton
Alton Brown Biography
Food Network Promos
Foodnetwork.com

Good Eats – Volume 15 – All in a Day's Eatin'
Disc 1 – Morning Munchables
Episodes
"Crêpe Expectations"
"The Waffle Truth"
"House of the Rising Bun"
Bonus Material
Ask Alton
Alton Brown Biography
Food Network Promos
Foodnetwork.com
Disc 2 – Flat Out Tasty
Episodes
"Flat is Beautiful II"
"Flat is Beautiful III"
"Cubing A Round"
Bonus Material
Ask Alton
Alton Brown Biography
Food Network Promos
Foodnetwork.com
Disc 3 – Tasty Toppings
Episodes
"Mayo Clinic"
"Hittin' the Sauce"
"The Case for Butter"
Bonus Material
Ask Alton
Alton Brown Biography
Food Network Promos
Foodnetwork.com

Good Eats – Volume 16 – Good Eats Greats
Disc 1 – A Snack In The Hand
Episodes
"Pretzel Logic"
"Pop Art"
"A Pie In Every Pocket"
Bonus Material
Good Eats Bloopers
Alton Brown Biography
Food Network Promos
Foodnetwork.com
Disc 2 – Alton's Liquid Assets
Episodes
"Water Works I"
"Water Works II"
"Milk Made"
Bonus Material
Good Eats Bloopers
Alton Brown Biography
Food Network Promos
Foodnetwork.com
Disc 3 – Protein Power
Episodes
"Sometimes You Feel Like A ..."
"Pantry Raid VI: Lentils"
"Tofuworld"
Bonus Material
Good Eats Bloopers
Alton Brown Biography
Food Network Promos
Foodnetwork.com

Good Eats – Volume 17 – Traveling South
Disc 1 – Down South Eats
Episodes
"Bowl O' Bayou"
"Peachy Keen"
"Okraphobia"
Bonus Material
Good Eats Bloopers
Alton Brown Biography
Food Network Promos
Foodnetwork.com
Disc 2 – Deep Fried Thanksgiving
Episodes
"Gravy Confidential"
"Stuff It"
"Fry Turkey Fry"
Bonus Material
Good Eats Bloopers
Alton Brown Biography
Food Network Promos
Foodnetwork.com
Disc 3 – South Of The Border Eats
Episodes
"Curious Yet Tasty Avocado Experiments"
"Tort(illa) Reform"
"Man With A Flan"
Bonus Material
Good Eats Bloopers
Alton Brown Biography
Food Network Promos
Foodnetwork.com

Good Eats – Volume 18 – Kitchen Classics
Disc 1 – That's Classic
Episodes
"American Classics I"
"Stew Romance"
"Sub Standards"
Bonus Material
Good Eats Bloopers
Alton Brown Biography
Food Network Promos
Foodnetwork.com
Disc 2 – Time Of The Seasoning
Episodes
"Herbal Preservation"
"Major Pepper"
"My Pod"
Bonus Material
Good Eats Bloopers
Alton Brown Biography
Food Network Promos
Foodnetwork.com
Disc 3 – Coffee And Dessert
Episodes
"Espress Yourself"
"Coconut Cake Revival"
"Churn Baby Churn II"
Bonus Material
Good Eats Bloopers
Alton Brown Biography
Food Network Promos
Foodnetwork.com

References

Good Eats